Julie Hickson is an American film producer and screenwriter. She helped write a 43-page story treatment for Tim Burton's 1989 film Batman in 1986. Prior to this, she produced Burton's 1983 television special Hansel and Gretel (also wrote) and his 1984 short film Frankenweenie.

Her other works include directing a short film entitled Fishing with George (1994), starring Eliza Dushku, and co-writing the films Homeward Bound II: Lost in San Francisco (1996) and Snow White: The Fairest of Them All (2001).

Filmography 
 Hansel and Gretel (1983) (producer and writer)
 Frankenweenie (1984) (producer)
 Fishing with George (short film) (1994)
 Homeward Bound II: Lost in San Francisco (1996) (writer)
 Snow White: The Fairest of Them All (TV film) (2001) (writer)

References

External links

Living people
American women screenwriters
Place of birth missing (living people)
Year of birth missing (living people)
American women film producers
21st-century American women